The 1873 McGill Redmen football team represented the McGill University during the 1873 college football season. The season featured the Harvard vs. McGill game played May 15, 1874, the first rugby-style football game played in the United States.

Schedule

See also
1874 Harvard vs. McGill football game

References

McGill
McGill Redbirds football seasons
College football winless seasons
McGill Redmen football
McGill Redmen football